College Football Live is a show that airs weekdays during the college football season on ESPN or ESPN2, and ESPNU.  Its premiere was on Monday, July 23, 2007. Wendi Nix serves as the lead host, and it also features ESPN college football analysts Desmond Howard, Joey Galloway, David Pollack, Trevor Matich and others. College Football Live also features Live interviews with college coaches and players.

Format
As previous host Rece Davis mentioned in the opening of the debut, College Football Live aims to be the most fan-interactive show on television, featuring email questions and video segments sent in by fans on every show. After the opening music and graphics, the show shifts into the ESPN side studio and Davis and the analysts open the show debating a top story of the day. After their segment has completed, they send it to Joe Schad or another insider on the situation who gives their take on it and breaks other information. Then, the segment "Live Feedback" takes place and questions sent in by viewers are answered by the personalities. After this segment, there are two rotating blocks, which on some days are two interviews but on other days, could be debate, highlights or breaking news.

At some point during the broadcast, the segment "EA Sports Simulator" is shown. In this segment, a key game is simulated on the video game NCAA Football 08 and highlights and score are shown. After this, a short debate segment is held before the closing segment "Extra Points" which is the same as "Live feedback" except done with a timer. As Rece Davis' trademark opening line he says "and here's (random college mascot) to give me the new questions". The show is supposed to be the college version of NFL Live, but is actually more similar to NASCAR Now in that it focuses more on guests and debate than breaking news. It also is similar to the show in that the analysts do not appear on the whole program and only appear for the debate segments.

College Football Live aired with a new format beginning in 2016. Samantha Ponder and Molly McGrath became its lead hosts on a rotating basis, with Jen Lada, Adnan Virk and Chris Cotter also anchoring. Instead of the host and contributors all being based in one studio, only the lead host remained studio-based, with analysts and contributors being shown from different locations.

By the day
Monday: "The Insiders"—weighing in with the latest news, reaction and analysis from the weekend's games; A look back at the best plays of the weekend
Tuesday: Live interviews with coaches 
Wednesday: "Conference Calls" with college football reporters from around the country.
Thursday: "Recruiting Trail" with Tom Luginbill providing the latest news on the top high school recruits; Live preview of ESPN's Thursday night game from game announcers
Friday: Picks and previews of Saturday's top games; College GameDay crew live from the location of Saturday's show; Live preview of ESPN's Friday night game

Segments
Senior Thesis- follows several top senior players through a personal video diary 
Sound Off- will feature home viewer-generated video on varopis topics
Live Feedback– Fans post comments online during the program and have them posted live on the air
Extra Points– Analysts answer e-mails and questions at the end of each show

Personalities

Current

Hosts

Wendi Nix (2007–2015) (2020–present)
Kelsey Riggs
Jen Lada (2016–present)
Jason Fitz
Peter Burns (2014–present)
Matt Schick

Analysts
Desmond Howard
Trevor Matich (2007–present)
Todd McShay (2007–present)
Andre Ware (2007–present)
David Pollack (2016–present)
Sam Acho (2021–present)
Harry Lyles Jr. (2021–present)

Contributors
Desmond Howard¹ (2007–present)
Tom Luginbill (2007–present)
Mark Schlabach (2007–present)
Rod Gilmore (2007–present)
Paul Finebaum¹ (2016–present)
Greg McElroy¹ (2016–present)
Joey Galloway (2014–present)
Shelley Smith
Booger McFarland¹
Brad Edwards¹
¹ also an analyst

Former
Erin Andrews (2010–2012); now with Fox Sports
Bonnie Bernstein (2008); 
Ryan Burr (2008-2010); 
Jim Donnan (2007–2014)
Doug Flutie (2007–present); now with NBC Sports
Pat Forde (2007–2011); Sports Illustrated
Bob Griese (2007–2011)
Craig James (2007–2011)
Lou Holtz (2007–2015)
Danny Kanell (2010–2016); CBS Sports
Erik Kuselias (2007-2010); now with CBS Sports
John Saunders (2007–2016) (Thursday and Friday); deceased
Robert Smith¹ (2007–2016); now with Fox Sports
Chris Spielman (2007–2016); special assistant to the owner and CEO of the Detroit Lions of the National Football League 
Matt Winer (2007–2009) now with Turner Sports
Mike Yam (2011); Pac-12 Network
Rece Davis (2007–2015) (host of College GameDay)
Chris Fowler (2010–2015); Saturday Night Football
Dari Nowkhah (2007–2015); SEC Network
Brent Musburger (2007–2015) ; the lead broadcaster and managing editor at Vegas Stats and Information Network and radio play-by-play voice for the Las Vegas Raiders.
Jonathan Coachman (2009–2015); CBS Sports
Mark May (2007–2015)
Lee Corso (2007–2015); College GameDay
Samantha Ponder (2016) (host of Sunday NFL Countdown)
Adnan Virk (2016–2017); now with DAZN and MLB Network
Brock Huard (2008–2018); now with Fox Sports
Emmanuel Acho (2019); now with Fox Sports
Ed Cunningham (2007–2016)
Cassidy Hubbarth (2016–2019); Host & reporter for NBA on ESPN & #HoopStreams on Twitter.
Joe Schad¹ (2007–2016); covering the Miami Dolphins and the NFL at the Palm Beach Post.
Ivan Maisel (2007–2021); national college football writer for On3.com and book author
Marcus Spears¹ (2016–2018); NFL Live
Rachel Nichols (2007–present)
Ryan Leaf (2019–present)
Todd Blackledge (2007–present)
Kirk Herbstreit (2007–present)
Jesse Palmer (2007–present)
Joe Tessitore (2016–present)

Producers
Scott Harves (2007–2009)
Tom Engle (2009)
Michael Epstein (2009–2011)
James Dunn (2011–present)

References

USA Today Article announcing creation of show
College Football Live Stream

External links

ESPN original programming
American sports television series
2010s American television series
2007 American television series debuts
College football studio shows
2020s American television series